OpenFX (OFX), a.k.a. The OFX Image Effect Plug-in API, is an open standard for 2D visual effects or compositing plug-ins. It allows plug-ins written to the standard to work on any application that supports the standard. The OpenFX standard is owned by The Open Effects Association, and it is released under a 'BSD' open source license. OpenFX was originally designed by Bruno Nicoletti at The Foundry Visionmongers.

Plug-ins are written as dynamic shared objects, and the API specifies a few entry points that must be implemented by the plug-in.

The OpenFX host exposes sets of entry points to the plug-in, called suites. The Property Suite is used to manage attribute-value pairs attached to objects defined by all other suites of the API, the Image Effect Suite is used to fetch film frames from the inputs or the output of the effect, and there are other suites to display informative messages or ask questions to the user, handle multithreading, use OpenGL for processing, etc.

Each plugin is described by a list of parameters and supported inputs and output. The host may execute various actions, for example to signal that a parameter value has changed or that a portion of a film frame has to be rendered.

Optionally, the plug-in may also display graphical information over the current frame using OpenGL, and propose interactions using mouse and keyboard (this is called interacts in the OFX specification).

An OpenFX host is an application capable of loading and executing OpenFX plugins.

History

 UPDATE: Current version is 1.4 as of June 2017

OpenFX was first announced on Feb 10, 2004 The Foundry Visionmongers.

The OpenFX specification was written so that a plugin supporting the latest version of the API may be implemented to be compatible with a host implementing an earlier version.

 OpenFX 1.0 was released in 2006.
 OpenFX 1.1 was released in 2007.
 OpenFX 1.2 was released in 2010.
 OpenFX 1.3 was released in 2012.
 OpenFX 1.4 was released in 2015.

Hosts

Free and open source hosts 
 ButtleOFX (for Linux, open source, LGPL license, alpha status, unmaintained)
 Kaliscope (scanner controller/batch conversion tool based on OpenFX host and plugins, open source, GPL 3 license)
 Natron for macOS, Linux, FreeBSD and Windows (open source, GPL license)
 Ramen compositor (CDDL 1.0 license, never officially released, but source code is available)
 ShuttleOFX (online OpenFX platform, open source, LGPL license)
 TuttleOFX (command-line OpenFX host and plugins, open source, LGPL license)

Commercial hosts 
 Baselight (from version 2.2) by FilmLight
 Catalyst Edit by Sony Creative Software
 DaVinci Resolve (from version 10) and DaVinci Resolve Lite, by Blackmagic Design
 DustBuster+ (from version 4.5), by HS-ART
 DVS Clipster by DVS
 EDIUS Pro (from version 8.1, by OFX-bridge plugin from NewBlueFX), by Grass Valley
 Fusion (from version 4.04), by Blackmagic Design (formerly by eyeon)
 HitFilm (from version 3 Pro) by FXhome
 Mistika (from version 6.5.35) and Mamba FX by SGO
 Motion Studio by IDT Vision
 Nucoda Film Master (from version 2011.2.058) by Digital Vision
 Nuke (from version 4.5), by The Foundry
 Piranha by Interactivefx
 Quantel Rio by SAM
 SCRATCH (from version 6.1), by Assimilate
 Titler Pro 4 by NewBlueFX
 Toon Boom Harmony
 Vegas Pro (from version 10), by Magix Software GmbH
 Vegas Movie Studio (Platinum edition and above), by Magix Software GmbH

Discontinued:
 Autodesk Toxik (from version 2009) (included with Maya)
 Avid DS (from version 10.3)
 Bones by Thomson/Technicolor
 MATRIX Compositing by Chrome Imaging
 Shake by Apple

OpenFX plug-ins

Free and open source plugins

 The official OpenFX SDK (BSD license) contain sample plugins, programmed using the standard C API, or a C++ wrapper.
 openfx-arena is a set of visual effects plugins, mainly based on ImageMagick.
 openfx-io is a set of plugins for reading or writing image and video files (using OpenImageIO and FFmpeg), and for color management (using OpenColorIO).
 openfx-misc is a collection of essential plugins, which provide many basic compositing tools, such as filters, geometric transforms, and color transforms. Commercial OpenFX hosts usually provide their own versions of these plugins.
 TuttleOFX provides many plug-ins, especially for color grading, usable in most OpenFX hosts.
 INK green/blue screen keyer and ChannelMath by casanico.com
TalentTracker by Mut1ny.com

Commercial plug-ins

 Beauty Box Video by digital anarchy
 Color Symmetry
 Composite Suite Pro, Film Stocks, Rays, reFine, zMatte, Tiffen DFX by Digital Film Tools
 DE:Flicker, DE:Noise, RE:Match, Twixtor and ReelSmart Motion Blur by RE:Vision Effects
 Film Convert for OFX by Rubber Monkey Software
 Genifect by Dual Heights Software
 HitFilm Ignite by FXhome
 Lenscare and Flair by frischluft
 RealPerception by Motiva
 Neat Video by ABSoft
 NewBlueFX plugins (including Titler Pro 3)
 Primatte by Photron/Imagica
 Red Giant Universe and Magic Bullet (in version 12.1, Looks, Film, Cosmo and Mojo are OpenFX plugins) by Red Giant Software
 Sapphire Visual Effects OFX and Monsters GT VFX Plugins OFX by GenArts
 White balance, exposure and color matching by FBmn Software
 InviziGrain by InviziPro

Extensions 
OpenFX' suite-based design enables one to easily introduce new sets of entry points, in order to cover other applications while still relying on the same core dynamic plug-in mechanism. A notable example is OpenMfx, an API based on OpenFX but meant to define procedural effects on 3D meshes rather than 2D images. An host that supports the Image Effects API does not necessarily support the Mesh Effect API, and vice versa, but both support the same core plug-in mechanism and basic suites like the Property Suite or the Parameter Suite. OpenMfx is an initiative independent from The Open Effects Association, led by Élie Michel since 2019.

Documentation
 The OFX Image Effects API is the official reference.
 The OFX Programming Guide for Image Effects by Bruno Nicoletti.
 OpenFX plugin programming guide, based on the C++ Support library.
OpenMfx documentation, an OFX Mesh Effects API, including the API reference as well as a C++ Support library and some tutorials.

References

External links
 The Open Effects Association
 Home page of the project

Application programming interfaces
Graphics standards